The Burla is a left tributary of the river Sitna in Romania. It discharges into the Sitna in Sulița.

References

Rivers of Romania
Rivers of Botoșani County